Nocardioides tritolerans is a Gram-positive and strictly aerobic bacterium from the genus Nocardioides which has been isolated from farming field soil on Bigeum Island, Korea.

References

External links
Type strain of Nocardioides tritolerans at BacDive -  the Bacterial Diversity Metadatabase	

tritolerans
Bacteria described in 2009